BAP Mariátegui is the last out of four Carvajal-class frigates ordered by the Peruvian Navy in 1973. It was built by SIMA (Servicio Industrial de la Marina) at Callao under license from the Italian shipbuilder Cantieri Navali Riuniti. Shortage of funds and technical difficulties delayed her completion for several years, being finally commissioned in 1987. In 1998 her flight deck was extended to allow ASH-3D Sea King helicopters to land and refuel, even though they are too large to be accommodated in the ship's hangar.

Mariátegui is named after Rear Admiral Ignacio Mariátegui who fought in the Peruvian War of Independence.

Gallery

Sources
 Rodríguez, John, "Las fragatas Lupo: una breve mirada retrospectiva y perspectivas". Revista de Marina, Year 95, No. 3: 8-32 (July / December 2002).

1984 ships
Carvajal-class frigates
Ships built in Peru